Stevenage Football Club is an English association football club based in Stevenage, Hertfordshire, currently playing in League Two. The club was formed in 1976 following the demise of the town's former club, Stevenage Athletic. They joined the United Counties League in 1980 and progressed through the United Counties and Isthmian leagues over the next decade. Stevenage won promotion into the Football Conference in 1994 and spent sixteen consecutive seasons in the highest tier of non-League football, before they were promoted to League Two in 2010. In their first season in the Football League, Stevenage won promotion to League One, the third tier of English football, before producing their highest league finish during the 2011–12 season. The club were relegated back into League Two at the end of the 2013–14 season. Below, is a list of players who have made 50 or more appearances for the club. In addition to this, the table also includes players who hold any records at the club.

Introduction
More than 160 players have appeared in at least 50 senior competitive matches for the club since its formation in 1976. Defender Ronnie Henry holds the club record for most appearances with 502, accumulated over two spells. He surpassed the previous record of 468, held by Mark Smith, in January 2018. Smith had held the record for 17 years. Martin Gittings holds the club record for total goals scored, 217. He is also the only player to have scored over 100 goals for the club, with Steve Morison coming closest with 89 in all competitions.

The list also includes those who have won the Stevenage Player of the Year. The Stevenage Player of the Year award is voted for annually by Stevenage's supporters in recognition of the best overall performance by an individual player throughout the football season. Three players have won the award twice; Mark Smith in 1995 and 2001, Jason Goodliffe in 2002 and 2003 and most recently Mark Roberts, in 2009 and 2012.

Key
Players are listed according to the date of their first professional contracted signed with the club. Appearances are for first-team competitive matches only. Substitute appearances are included. All figures are correct as of 3 June 2022.

Note: Players in bold are still playing for Stevenage.

List of players

Footnotes

A.  Appearances and goals in the Conference National (including play-offs), Conference League Cup, FA Cup, Football League Cup, Football League Trophy, FA Trophy, Isthmian League and United Counties League.

B.  Club record holder: Gittings holds for the club record for total goals scored, 217, from 1980 to 1995. Gittings also won the Stevenage Player of the Year award for the 1993–94 season.

C.  Hayles was sold to Bristol Rovers for £250,000 in 1997, which was the club record for a transfer fee received by the club at the time. He won the 1995–96 Stevenage Player of the Year award.

D.  Berry captained the club to the Conference National title in the 1995–96 season.

E.  Boyd previously held the club record for the highest transfer fee received by the club, £260,000, which was paid by Peterborough United on 8 January 2007.

F.  Club record holder: Henry is the club's all-time record appearance holder having made 502 appearances. He won the 2006–07 Stevenage Player of the Year award. During his time as captain at the club, Henry lifted the FA Trophy in May 2007. This also meant that Henry became the first ever player to lift a competitive trophy at the new Wembley Stadium.

G.  During his time as captain at the club, Morison lifted the FA Trophy in May 2009. He won the 2007–08 Stevenage Player of the Year award.

H.  Roberts captained the club to back-to-back promotions during the 2009–10 and 2010–11 seasons. He won the 2008–09 and 2011–12 Stevenage Player of the Year awards.

I.  Club record holder: Wilmot was sold to Watford in May 2018 for a club record fee. The fee received was over £1million.

References
General

Specific

External links
 Stevenage F.C. official website
 Stevenage F.C. on Soccerbase

Players
 
Stevenage
Association football player non-biographical articles